Chichicapac (possibly from Quechua ch'ichi shoot; dirt, dirty, chichi naked; udder full of milk; gold powder, qhapaq the mighty one, Hispanicized spellings Chichicapac, Chichiccapac, Chichicápac, Chichijapac, Chichi Cápac) is a mountain in the Andes of Peru. Chichicapac is located in the Puno Region, Carabaya Province, on the border of the districts of Ayapata and Macusani. It lies southeast of the higher mountains Huaynaccapac and Allincapac and northeast of the lake Chaupicocha.

References

Mountains of Peru
Mountains of Puno Region